Slabtown is an unincorporated community in Boggs Township, Armstrong County, Pennsylvania, United States. It has also been known as Baum.

References

Unincorporated communities in Armstrong County, Pennsylvania
Unincorporated communities in Pennsylvania